Michael Dwyer (1772–1825) was a Society of the United Irishmen leader in the 1798 rebellion.

Michael or Mike Dwyer may also refer to:
Michael Dwyer (journalist) (1951–2010), Irish film critic and journalist
Michael Dwyer (Canadian politician) (1879–1953), businessman and political figure in Nova Scotia, Canada
Michael Dwyer (North Dakota politician), member of the North Dakota Senate
Michael Martin Dwyer (1984–2009), Irishman killed by Bolivian police
Michael F. Dwyer (1847–1906), American businessman and racehorse owner
Michael Middleton Dwyer, American architect
Mike Dwyer (ice hockey) (born 1957), Canadian ice hockey player
Mike Dwyer (American football) (born 1963), American football player
Mike Dwyer (athlete) (born 1962), Canadian sprinter

See also 
 Michael Dwyers (disambiguation)